Rhymer’s Tower, also known as Earlston Castle, is located near the village of Earlston, Scottish Borders, Scotland. The castle was the caput baroniae of the barony of Earlston. It was owned by the Lindsay family in the 12th century and passed to the Dunbar family in the 13th century.

The ruins of a 16th century border peel are all that remain.

References
Coventry, Martin. Castles of the Clans: the strongholds and seats of 750 Scottish families and clans. Musselburgh, 2008.

Castles in the Scottish Borders
Buildings and structures in the Scottish Borders
Demolished buildings and structures in Scotland
Former castles in Scotland
Clan Lindsay